Benproperine (INN) is a cough suppressant. It has been marketed in multiple countries in Central America and Europe, as the phosphate or pamoate salts in either tablet, dragée, or syrup form. Trade names include Blascorid in Italy and Sweden, Pectipront and Tussafug in Germany, and Pirexyl in Scandinavia. The recommended dosage for adults is 25 to 50 mg two to four times daily, and for children 25 mg once or twice daily. Adverse effects include dry mouth, dizziness, fatigue, and heartburn.

Synthesis

The base catalyzed ether formation between 2-Benzylphenol [28994-41-4] (1) and 1,2-dichloropropane (2) gives 1-benzyl-2-(2-chloropropoxy)benzene [85909-36-0] (3). Displacement of the remaining halogen with piperidine completes the synthesis of benproperine (4).

References 

Antitussives
1-Piperidinyl compounds
2-Phenoxyethanamines
Abandoned drugs